Copăceni is a commune in Sîngerei District, Moldova. It is composed of six villages: Antonovca, Copăceni, Evghenievca, Gavrilovca, Petrovca and Vladimireuca (formerly Vladimirești).

Notable people
 Adrian Păunescu 
 Gheorghe Duca

References

Communes of Sîngerei District